The Russ Jackson Award is presented to the U Sports Football player best exemplifying the attributes of academic achievement, football skill, and citizenship and is named in honour of Canadian Football League Hall of Famer and former Ottawa Rough Riders and McMaster University quarterback, Russ Jackson.

List of Russ Jackson award winners

See also
Hec Crighton Trophy
Presidents' Trophy
Peter Gorman Trophy
J. P. Metras Trophy

References

External links
 U Sports Football Home Page

U Sports football trophies and awards